George Arthur Frank Plunkett (1913–2006) was an English photographer. Plunkett was born in Norwich, and from 1931 to 2006, built a comprehensive photographic survey of his home city and further afield. His written work includes five papers for the Norfolk and Norwich Archaeological Society published in the society's transactions and two published books.

From February 2016, a permanent exhibition of Plunkett's work has been on show in the George Plunkett Room at the Sir Garnet public house close to the city's market square.

Biography
After attending Avenue Road School and later the City of Norwich School, he commenced work at the Norwich Public Health Department in March, 1929. In World War Two, he served with the RAF from January 1941 to February 1946. After the war ended he returned to work in his previous employment, where he met his future wife Margaret. The couple had two sons, Philip and Jonathan. Plunkett voluntarily retired from the local authority and obtained employment with Norwich Union before retiring in March 1978, aged 65.

Photographic career
Plunkett started photographing Norwich in 1931 after acquiring a box camera. Realising its limitations he replaced it the following year with an Ensign Carbine Number 7, which he used for the rest of his career. In 2000, his complete collection of Norwich photographs were made available on the Internet.

Publications
Disappearing Norwich    (1987) 
Rambles in Old Norwich  (1990)

References

1913 births
2006 deaths
Military personnel from Norwich
Royal Air Force personnel of World War II
20th-century Royal Air Force personnel
People from Norwich
Photographers from Norfolk
Writers from Norwich
People educated at the City of Norwich School